Pittsburg is a city in Crawford County, Kansas, United States, located in southeast Kansas near the Missouri state border.  It is the most populous city in Crawford County and southeast Kansas.  As of the 2020 census, the population of the city was 20,646.  It is the home of Pittsburg State University.

History

On October 23, 1864, a wagon train of refugees had come from Fort Smith, Arkansas, and was escorted by troops from the 6th Kansas Cavalry under the command of Col. William Campbell.  These were local men from Cherokee, Crawford, and Bourbon counties.  Their enlistment was over, and they were on their way to Fort Leavenworth to be dismissed from service.  They ran into the 1st Indian Brigade led by Maj. Andrew Jackson Piercy near the current Pittsburg Waste Water Treatment Plant.  They continued to the north when a small group of wagons broke away in an unsuccessful rush to safety.  The Confederate troops caught up with them and burned the wagons.  The death toll was three Union soldiers and 13 civilian men who had been with the wagon train.  It was likely that one of the Confederates had also been killed.  A granite marker memorial for the "Cow Creek Skirmish" was placed near the Crawford County Historical Museum on October 30, 2011.

Pittsburg sprang up in the fall of 1876 on a railroad line being built through the neighborhood. It was named after Pittsburgh, Pennsylvania, and maps of the time give the town's name as "New Pittsburgh". George Hobson and Franklin Playter are credited with being the city's founders, establishing a government after its beginnings as a coal mining camp in the 1870s. The city was incorporated in 1879. The “New” was dropped upon incorporation of the City as a third class city on June 21, 1880, with M. M. Snow as its first Mayor. In 1892 it was advanced to a city of the second class, in 1905 Pittsburg attained the rank of first class.

The first dwelling was built by J. T. Roach in July 1876. The first post office in Pittsburg was established in August, 1876. The post office's name was shortened from "New Pittsburgh" to "Pittsburgh" in 1881 and to "Pittsburg" in 1894. The latter renaming came after the United States Board on Geographic Names, in the interest of standardization, recommended that the 'h' be dropped from place names ending in "burgh".

Pittsburg is the home to Pittsburg State University, founded in 1903 as a normal training institution. Through the years the College became more diversified in its aims and goals, so that it became a multi-purpose institution. It has always had a strong manual and industrial arts program and has trained many of the area's public and private school teachers.

In 1879, two miners from Joplin began the first commercial attempts at mining in close proximity of Broadway Street. A relic of the city's coal mining days was the Pittsburg & Midway Coal Company, founded in 1885, and one of the oldest continuously running coal companies in the United States (even though its headquarters moved several years ago to Denver, Colorado after the Kansas mines closed). In September 2007, Chevron which owned the company, merged it with its Molycorp Inc. coal mining division to form Chevron Mining, thus ending the Pittsburg corporate name.  Midway referred to a coal camp in eastern Crawford County, Kansas that was "midway" between Baxter Springs, Kansas and Fort Scott, Kansas.  Kenneth A. Spencer, whose father was among the founders of the company was to play an important role in Kansas and Missouri philanthropy.

Pittsburg was also the most heavily unionized city in Kansas at the beginning of the 20th century. In addition to some coal mining, the economic base of the City now rests on industry.

The city has a rich cultural heritage from many Southern and Eastern European mine workers who settled in and around Pittsburg and Southeastern Kansas.  It is situated in a once productive coal field.  It now relies heavily on education and government-related employment.

Geography
Pittsburg sits in the Ozark Highlands region, a mix of prairie and forests.

Climate
Pittsburg has a humid subtropical climate (Köppen Cfa) bordering on a hot-summer humid continental climate (Dfa). Summers are hot and humid, with as many as 73 mornings per year staying above  and eight mornings remaining above  – indeed in July 2012 the temperature did not fall below . The hottest morning, however, was on August 10, 2006 when the temperature did not fall below , and the hottest temperature has been  on July 13 and 14, 1954. Heavy thunderstorm rains often punctuate the heat with heavy rainfall:  fell on July 30, 2013. Periods of hot weather without much rain are not uncommon: only trace precipitation fell between July 28 and September 10, 2000, and only  between July 7 and August 20, 1984.

During the fall season, temperatures cool off fairly rapidly: the last  temperature can be expected on September 22, and by the end of October temperatures have usually fallen to a comfortable level.

As with all of Kansas, winter weather is extremely variable, although extreme maxima are not as hot as in the southwest of the state as Pittsburg is far from the influence of hot chinook winds. Arctic outbreaks bring temperatures to or below  on average once per winter, while maxima over  can be expected four times between December and February. Winter weather is less dry than in most of Kansas since moist Gulf air often penetrates without reaching most of the state: December 2015 saw  of rain, and the very cold January 1979 saw sixteen days with at least  of measurable precipitation. The most snow in a day has been  on December 13, 2000, and the most snow on the ground  on February 4 and 5, 2011 and March 17, 1970.

Spring weather is changeable and often suspect to severe storms: Pittsburg lies in the heart of “Tornado Alley”. The changeable weather from hot to cold can be accompanied by frequent heavy precipitation: Pittsburg can expect  of precipitation between March and June, approximately what Dodge City or Liberal further west receive in a whole year. Temperatures warm up during the spring: the first temperature of  can be expected on March 27, but the first of  does not normally occur until May 28.

Demographics

2020 census
Population estimates from the US Census Bureau place Pittsburg’s current population at 20,738 for 2021. As of the 2020 decennial census, there were 20,646 people, up from 20,233 in 2010. This increase of roughly 2% reflects the steady population growth Pittsburg has experienced over the last decade, due to the continued investments from private industry and multiple new housing developments.

As of the 2020 census, there were 8,047 households in the city and the median value of owner-occupied housing units was $86,800. The percent of persons age 25 years or older with a high school diploma was 90.8% and the percent of persons in the same demographic with a bachelor’s degree or higher was 29.9%.

Arts and culture

Events
Little Balkans Days is a three-day festival celebrating the community's European ethnic heritage, held on the Labor Day weekend. It features games, entertainment, competitions, and arts and crafts. The Pittsburg Art Walk takes features vendors, artists, and musicians; it occurs multiple times per year on Broadway Street in Pittsburg's downtown district.

Points of interest
 

 The Bicknell Family Center for the Arts houses multiple performance halls.
 Memorial Auditorium opened in 1925, and features Egyptian Revival Style architecture. It hosts concerts and performances.
 Pittsburg Aquatic Center is a community swimming pool.
 Carnie Smith Stadium is a Classical Revival style stadium opened in 1924, and is Pittsburg State University’s home football field and outdoor track facility.
 Jaycee Ballpark.
 Veteran's Memorial features a 250-seat amphitheater, a Vietnam Veteran's Memorial Wall replica, a reflecting pool, and plaza with over 2,000 engraved paving stones.
 Robert W. Plaster Center is a track-and-field facility.
 Block 22 is a commercial district.
 Crawford County Historical Museum and Green Elm School.
 Miners' Memorial and Immigrant Park.
 Kansas Crossing Casino

Library
 Pittsburg Public Library
 Leonard H. Axe Library at Pittsburg State University

Parks and recreation

Pittsburg hosts a multitude of parks inside it’s city limits
 23rd Street Bike Park - single track mountain biking park, a skills area, pump track, and dirt jump area
 Countryside Park - playground and pavilion
 Deramus Park - basketball court, playground, small sports field
 Europe Park - unique water features and a seating area
 Kiwanis Park - playground and pavilion
 Lakeside Park - lake, accessible fishing dock and parking area, playground, two pavilions, tennis courts
 Lincoln Park - J.J. Richards Band Dome, Kiddieland Amusement Park, Pittsburg Aquatic Center, Don Gutteridge Sports Complex, two bocce courts, nine-hole disc, golf course, fishing, playground, restrooms, and three pavilions
 Paul B. Leffler Rotary Park - basketball court, grill, playground, and a small sports fields
 Schlanger Park - Katherine’s playground (ADA accessible), Ronald O. Thomas Dog Park, basketball court, pickleball court, sensory garden, two pavilions, skate park, sand volleyball, 18-hole disc golf course, and a splashpad
 Sunflower Kiwanis Park - playground and pavilion
 Trail Head Park/Watco Trail - pergola, benches, 1.5-mile paved walking and biking trail
 Wilderness Park - four miles of trail and four pits for fishing. (Most of the trail is ADA accessible)

Government

Pittsburg is a charter city of the first class with a commission/manager form of government. The City Manager oversees all City operations and is responsible for all City departments and employees.

City Hall is located at 201 West 4th Street. Offices are open from 8:00 am until 5:00 pm Monday through Friday, but are closed on most holidays.

The responsibilities of the City Commission are to pass ordinances and resolutions, establish policies for the City, approve the annual budget, appoint members of citizen advisory boards and committees, and appoint the City Manager.

Elections for the City Commission are held every other year. In each election, three seats are vacant on the City Commission. The two candidates acquiring the most votes receive four-year terms, while the candidate obtaining the third most votes secures a two-year term. The City Commission annually elects the Mayor and President of the Board. The Mayor, who has the same authority as the other commissioners, presides over the commission meetings, provides the official signature on documents, represents the City at official and ceremonial functions and presents the annual State of the City address. In the absence of the Mayor, the President of the Board fulfills the duties of the Mayor.

Education

Public schools
The city is served by Pittsburg USD 250 public school district, which operates the following schools:
 Pittsburg High School 
 Pittsburg Community Middle School
 George Nettels Elementary School
 Lakeside Elementary School
 Meadowlark Elementary School
 Westside Elementary School

Private schools
 St. Mary's-Colgan High School, Parochial Catholic School
 Countryside Christian School, Private Christian School (K-8)
 Covenant Harvest, Christian School

College
 Pittsburg State University
 Fort Scott Community College, School of cosmetology
 Labette Community College, Cherokee Center

Media

The Pittsburg Morning Sun is the main newspaper in the city, published five days a week. In addition, Pittsburg State University publishes a weekly student newspaper, the Collegio.

Pittsburg is a center of broadcast media for southeastern Kansas. Two AM and five FM radio stations are licensed to and/or broadcast from the city, and it is the second principal city of the Joplin-Pittsburg television market. The market's CBS and Fox network affiliates both broadcast from the city along with an independent station.

Infrastructure

Public transportation
 Bus System, Pittsburg Area Community Transportation (P.A.C.T)  
 Taxi services

Airport
 Atkinson Municipal Airport, Aircraft based on the field 41

Medical
 Via Christi Hospital (formerly Mt. Carmel Regional Medical Center) serves the area with services such as Regional Cancer and Heart Centers.

Notable people

Notable individuals who were born in and/or have lived in Pittsburg include actor Roy Glenn, chemical entrepreneur Kenneth A. Spencer, and broadcast journalism pioneer Paul White.

In popular culture
In late 2012, NBC news anchor Brian Williams, who started his career in Pittsburg as a journalist at KOAM-TV, covered the local story of a fried chicken war between Chicken Annie's and Chicken Mary's on the Travel Channel. The competition began in 1941 when Chicken Mary's opened across the street from Chicken Annie’s (founded 1934). The friendly rivalry continues, with members of each restaurant's founding family who married running a third restaurant.

References

Further reading

External links

 City of Pittsburg
 Pittsburg - Directory of Public Officials
 Pittsburg Area Chamber of Commerce
 Pittsburg city map, KDOT
 
 
 

 
Cities in Kansas
Cities in Crawford County, Kansas
Micropolitan areas of Kansas
Populated places established in 1876
1876 establishments in Kansas